Olaf Bjørn Bjørnstad (10 January 1931 – 12 May 2013) was a Norwegian ski jumper. 

He won the second Four Hills Tournament (1953/1954), by winning in Oberstdorf, Garmisch-Partenkirchen Photo of Olaf B Bjornstad Ski Jumping in Garmisch Partenkirchen, Germany and Innsbruck, and finishing 3rd in Bischofshofen.

See also
List of combined Four Hills Tournament Winners

References

1931 births
2013 deaths
Norwegian male ski jumpers